Sadikshah Qadri (10 June 1918 3 September 1978) was an Indian Sufi saint and yogi of Pashan, a suburb located 15 kilometres from the city of Pune.

Indian Sufi saints
1918 births
1978 deaths
Qadiri order
Indian yogis
People from Pune